Death to the Daleks is the third serial of the 11th season of the British science fiction television series Doctor Who, which was first broadcast in four weekly parts on BBC1 from 23 February to 16 March 1974.

In the serial, the Daleks and a human expedition both arrive on the planet Exxilon to seek a mineral found in abundance there. This was the last serial to have an episode's master tape wiped, but all episodes now exist in colour in the archives.

Plot

The TARDIS suffers an energy drain and lands on the planet Exxilon. The Third Doctor and Sarah Jane Smith go to investigate the cause of the interference, and become separated. The Doctor is captured by the planet's inhabitants, the savage Exxilons, but escapes. Sarah Jane is attacked by one of the creatures in the TARDIS, and flees, finding a huge city with a flashing beacon.

At dawn, the Doctor is found by a party of humans from the Marine Space Corps; they take him to their ship, which has been stranded by the power drain. They are on an expedition to mine "Parrinium" – a mineral abundant only on Exxilon – which can cure and give immunity from a deadly space plague. If the expedition does not leave the planet with a supply of Parrinium within a month then millions will die. They show the Doctor photos of the nearby city – which the Exxilons worship, sacrificing anyone who ventures too close. Sarah Jane does so and is captured and taken to the Exxilons' caves to be sacrificed by their High Priest.

Another ship arrives, and four Daleks emerge. Their ship has also been affected by the energy drain. The Daleks encounter the Doctor and attempt to exterminate him, but their weapons do not work either. The Daleks claim that several of their planetary colonies are suffering from plague; thus they need Parrinium for the same reason as the humans. The Daleks, the Doctor, and the humans form an uneasy alliance to obtain Parrinium and escape Exxilon. While the allies are making their way to the humans' mining dome, the Exxilons ambush them. A battle ensues and the Exxilons end up killing a human and a Dalek and capturing the others. The prisoners are taken to the Exxilon caves where the Doctor interrupts Sarah Jane's sacrifice; therefore, he is also condemned to death. When the dual sacrifice commences, a second party of Daleks arrive, which have replaced their energy weapons with mechanical firearms that use bullets. The Daleks kill a number of Exxilons, then force the Exxilons and humans to mine Parrinium. The Doctor and Sarah Jane flee into tunnels. The other party of Daleks arrive and they discuss their actual plan to use Parrinium to create a plague and spread it across every planet except their own.

The Doctor and Sarah Jane meet a group of subterranean, fugitive Exxilons. Their leader, Bellal, explains that the city was built by the Exxilons' ancestors, who were once capable of space travel. They built the city to be capable of maintaining, repairing, and protecting itself. Fitting the structure with a brain meant that the city no longer needed its creators. On realising this, the Exxilons had tried to destroy the city, but the city destroyed most of them; the savage surface dwellers and Bellal's group are the only survivors. Bellal's people seek to complete their ancestors' last, failed act – to destroy the city and ensure their race's survival. Bellal sketches some of the markings on the city wall; the Doctor recognises the markings from a temple in Peru deducing that the ancient Exxilons visited Earth. Bellal also explains that the city supports itself through underground "roots" and the aerial beacon. The Doctor realises that the beacon must be the cause of the energy drain and decides to go to the city and resolve the problem.

The Daleks come to the same conclusion and create two timed explosives to destroy the beacon. One Dalek supervises two humans placing the explosives, but one of the humans, Galloway, secretly keeps one bomb. Two other Daleks enter the city to investigate the superstructure, but the Doctor and Bellal enter the city just before them. The two parties then proceed through the city, passing a series of progressive intelligence tests. The Doctor reasons that the city has arranged the tests so that only lifeforms with knowledge comparable to that of the city's creators would reach the brain, allowing the city to add the knowledge of the survivors to its databanks. On reaching the central chamber, the Doctor begins to sabotage the city's computer brain; the machine responds by creating two Exxilon-like "antibodies" to "neutralise" the Doctor and Bellal. The pair are saved when the Daleks enter and fight the antibodies, and the Doctor and Bellal escape as the city's sabotaged controls begin to malfunction. The two Daleks inside are destroyed.

When the bomb on the beacon explodes, all power is restored. The Daleks order the humans to load the Parrinium onto their ship. On leaving Exxilon, the Daleks intend to fire a plague missile onto the planet, destroying all life and making future landings impossible, so that they will have the only source of Parrinium. Their true intention for hoarding Parrinium is to blackmail the galactic powers to accept their demands; refusal would mean the deaths of millions. As their ship takes off, Sarah Jane reveals that the Daleks have only bags of sand while the real Parrinium is on the Earth ship, which is now ready to take off. Galloway has smuggled himself and his bomb aboard the Dalek ship; he detonates the bomb, destroying the Dalek ship before it fires the plague missile. Back on Exxilon, the City disintegrates and collapses, the Doctor sadly commenting that the Universe is now down to 699 Wonders.

Production
Working titles for this story were The Exilons and The Exxilons. The incidental music for this serial was composed by Carey Blyton and performed by the London Saxophone Quartet.

This is one of two Third Doctor serials (the other being The Claws of Axos) to still have a 90-minute PAL studio recording tape.

Missing episodes
Part One of this story was chronologically the last to have its original master videotape wiped for re-use. This was initially returned to the BBC archive in 1981 through the discovery of a 525-line NTSC recording from Canada. Subsequently, two separate PAL recordings were discovered, including a high quality 625-line recording returned in 1991 as part of a shipment from Dubai. The other PAL copy had been returned to the BBC from Australia in 1985, although it had been edited and censored.

Broadcast and reception

Paul Cornell, Martin Day, and Keith Topping wrote of the serial in The Discontinuity Guide (1995), "A confused story with, for once, too much rather than too little plot. There really doesn't seem any need to have the Daleks in it at all. There are some adequate sacrifice scenes for Sarah to scream in, but the production seems tired and insipid". In The Television Companion (1998), David J. Howe and Stephen James Walker were more positive, even opining that it was the best of the eleventh season. They wrote that, despite the "small scale" action, "the scripts are still well-written and entertaining, with a good premise and some interesting concepts", and the story overall was "of excellent set pieces and impressive images". However, Howe and Walker were less impressed with the model shots of the city disintegrating, the Exxilons' character depth, and the incidental music.

In 2010, Patrick Mulkern of Radio Times wrote that the story had appeal, with the Daleks at their "duplicitous best" and the first episode being "arguably the most effective episode of season 11". However, he was critical of Blyton's score and felt that Pertwee and the guest cast seemed unenthused, and also noted that the Doctor and Sarah lacked chemistry and the Doctor "verges on insufferably patronising and is landed with dreadful lines". DVD Talk's John Sinnott gave Death to the Daleks four out of five stars, praising the Daleks, the pace, and the supporting characters, and in contrast to Mulkern, he praised the chemistry between the Doctor and Sarah. However, he felt that the ending in which the Doctor solves puzzles was simplistic and lacked suspense. Ian Berriman, reviewing the serial for SFX, rated it three out of four stars, describing it as "a perfectly adequate four episodes of generic action-adventure". Berriman praised the atmospheric direction, Bellal, and felt that the score "effectively conjures an air of the uncanny". However, he felt that the Daleks were "daft", and criticised the puzzle plot and Jill, the "feeble" sole female character.

Commercial releases

In print

A novelisation of this serial, written by Terrance Dicks, was published by Target Books in July 1978. A German translation was published in 1990 by Goldmann.

Home media
The serial was released on video in an omnibus format in July 1987, the first Doctor Who video to be released on just VHS, instead of both VHS and Betamax. As the PAL version of episode one was not yet known to exist, this used the NTSC version of the episode. In the US, it was released by Playhouse Video (a subsidiary of CBS/Fox Video) on VHS and Beta. An episodic release (with the PAL version of episode one) was released on 13 February 1995, although episode two was slightly edited due to BBC Video mistakenly using a cut version of episode 2 returned from ABC TV in Australia (episodes 3 & 4 were also from ABC TV), instead of the UK master tapes of episodes 2–4. Death to the Daleks was released on DVD in the UK on 18 June 2012, and in region 1 on 10 July 2012.

References

External links

Target novelisation

On Target — Death to the Daleks

Third Doctor serials
Dalek television stories
Doctor Who serials novelised by Terrance Dicks
Television episodes written by Terry Nation